Sun and Moon (or, less commonly, Moon and Sun), The Sun and the Moon, or variants may refer to:

Places
 The Sun and the Moon in classical astronomy and astrology, see classical planets
 Sun and Moon Bay, Hainan, China
 Sun Moon Lake, Yuchi Township, Nantou County, Taiwan

Literature
 "Sun and Moon" (Mansfield), a 1920 short story by Katherine Mansfield
 The Moon and the Sun, a 1997 novel
 Sun & Moon, a Los Angeles publisher
 Brother and sister who became the sun and moon, Korean fairy tale
 The Sun and the Moon, a traditional Inuit story

Film and TV 
 The Moon and the Sun (film), a 2022 film released as "The King's Daughter", originally scheduled for release in 2015 as "The Moon and the Sun"
 Moon Embracing the Sun, also known as The Sun and the Moon, a 2012 South Korean television drama series

Music 
 The Sun The Moon The Stars, an American metal band

Albums 
 The Sun and the Moon (The Bravery album), an album by The Bravery
 The Sun and the Moon Complete, a remix album by The Bravery
 The Sun and the Moon (The Sun and the Moon album), an album by the band of the same name
 Earth and Sun and Moon, an album by Midnight Oil
 Earth, Sun, Moon, an album by Love and Rockets
 Sun and Moon, an album by Sam Kim
 Sun and Moon, an album by Phil Chang

Songs 
 "East of the Sun (and West of the Moon)", a jazz standard
 "Sun & Moon (Above & Beyond song)", a progressive house track by Above & Beyond featuring Richard Bedford
 "Sun & Moon", by NCT 127 from Cherry Bomb
 "The Sun and the Moon", by The Corrs from Jupiter Calling
 "Sun & Moon", by Claude-Michel Schönberg and Alain Boublil from the musical Miss Saigon
 "Sun & Moon", by Two Steps from Hell from the album SkyWorld
 "Sun and Moon", by Anees

Other
 Pokémon Sun and Moon, handheld video games for the Nintendo 3DS
Pokémon the Series: Sun & Moon
Wall of the Sun and Wall of the Moon, a pair of murals
The Creation of the Sun, Moon and Vegetation, a painting by Michelangelo

See also

Sun
The Sun in culture
Solar deity
Moon
Lunar deity
Moon in fiction
Union of the Sun and Moon
Sun and Moon allegory
Sun and moon letters
Moon (disambiguation)
Sun (disambiguation)